Puan Maharani Nakshatra Kusyala Devi (born 6 September 1973) is an Indonesian politician from the Indonesian Democratic Party of Struggle (PDI-P), who is serving as the current speaker of the House of Representatives (DPR), Indonesia's lower house since 2019. She is the first female and the third-youngest person (being aged 46, when she took the oath of office) to take the office permanently. She previously served as the Coordinating Minister for Human Development and Cultural Affairs between 2014 and 2019, also becoming the first female and the youngest among all past and present coordinating ministers, being only 41 when she took office.

Puan is the youngest child and the only daughter of former president and current PDI-P leader Megawati Sukarnoputri, and a granddaughter of Indonesia's first president Sukarno. Her father, Taufiq Kiemas, was a politician who served as the speaker of the People's Consultative Assembly from 2009 until his death in 2013.

A member of the PDI-P, she was first elected to the People's Representative Council in 2009. She served as head of the party's faction from 2012 until her selection as minister in 2014 following the ascent of President Joko Widodo from PDI-P. She was one of eight women selected as ministers and the only female coordinating minister. She was again re-elected to the People's Representative Council in the 2019 election.

Early life and education

Early life 
Puan Maharani Nakshatra Kusyala Devi was born on 6 September 1973. Her mother was former president and current PDI-P leader Megawati Sukarnoputri, the daughter of Indonesia's first president Sukarno, making her the granddaughter of Sukarno. Her father was Taufiq Kiemas, a politician who served as the speaker of the People's Consultative Assembly from 2009 until his death in 2013.

Education 
Up until elementary school (SD), Puan lived a relatively normal and uneventful life, despite being the granddaughter of the first president Sukarno. This was until she was in junior high school (SMP), as her mother Megawati, became active again in Indonesian politics during the New Order. She graduated from high school (SMA) in 1991, and entered the University of Indonesia in 1991 to study literature and in 1992 to pursue a bachelor's degree in mass communication. She earned the latter in 1997.

Political career

2001–2004: Megawati presidency 
After the fall of Suharto in 1998, Puan became involved in politics as her mother was one of the main players in the national political scene. During the three-year Megawati presidency, she would often accompany her mother on domestic and foreign official visits, in addition to conducting social events by herself.

2009–2014: People's Representative Council 
In 2008, Megawati introduced Puan, then head of PDI-P's public and women's empowerment wing, as her successor during campaigning for the East Java 2008 gubernatorial elections in Ngawi. Following that, Maharani ran in the 2009 elections in Central Java's election district 5 (covering Surakarta, Sukoharjo, Klaten and Boyolali) and won 242,504 votes - the second highest of all parliamentary candidates in the nation. During her first term, she acted as head of the PDI-P faction since 2012, replacing Tjahjo Kumolo (who later became Minister of Home Affairs). She was assigned to the DPR's 6th commission, covering investment and SMEs. During this period, she argued against a fuel price hike policy in 2013.

2014 Presidential election 
Later, she was briefly put up as a possible PDI-P presidential candidate for the 2014 elections and as a possible vice presidential candidate to Joko Widodo (popularly known as Jokowi). In the legislative elections, she won 326,927 votes, once more scoring the second-most votes nationwide.

2014–2019: Coordinating Minister 
Following Jokowi's election victory over Prabowo Subianto in the concurrent presidential election, she was appointed a cabinet minister amid criticism over her inexperience and her mother's political influence. Her replacement in parliament, Alfia Reziani, was only sworn in by 2016. She claimed success during her tenure, pointing at the rising HDI in addition to lower poverty and Gini ratio statistics. She was the only coordinating minister to survive two cabinet reshuffles in Jokowi's first term, prompting the media to describe her as "untouchable".

Mental revolution website failure 
On 24 August 2016, in her capacity as Coordinating Minister for Human Development and Culture, Puan launched a website, revolusimental.go.id, to promote President Joko Widodo's call for a "mental revolution" in Indonesia. The ministry had received budget funds of Rp149 billion in 2015, resulting in criticism when the revolusimental website went "down" two days after its launch. Officials claimed the site had been hacked and had cost "only" Rp200 million. Reports noted that some of the site's script code had been taken from barackobama.com, a site operated by supporters of Barack Obama. The original site was also built on a theme from open-source website platform WordPress and hosted on a shared server. The website was later redeveloped, but was criticized for being "heavy on budget, light on content". Puan defended the website, saying: “l really want everyone to participate in this programme by joining the activities as well as giving us their opinions or criticisms.”

Corruption scandal 
On 22 March 2018, former House of Representatives speaker Setya Novanto, while on trial for corruption, testified Puan received a bribe of $500,000 from businessman Made Oka Masagung in connection with an electronic identity card program when she was a legislator, serving as chairwoman of the PDIP faction in the House of Representatives. Puan admitted to knowing Made Oka but denied discussing the e-ID case with him. Made Oka, who was jailed for 10 years for his role in the e-ID bribery scandal, denied giving any money to legislators, saying he could not remember a meeting with them. Indonesia Corruption Watch called on the Corruption Eradication Commission (KPK) to check the veracity of the allegation made against Puan. KPK chairman Agus Rahardjo said Setya's testimony was "only talk" and Puan would not be questioned if no evidence had been found.

2019–present: Speakership 
Following Indonesia's April 2019 general election, in which provisional results indicated PDIP had received the most votes, Puan was touted to become Speaker of the House for the 2019-2024 period, becoming the first female Speaker of the body. She has also indicated she may run for the presidency in 2024. Individually, she obtained 404,034 votes for her ticket for the council, the most of any legislative candidates in the country. She was appointed as Speaker on 1 October 2019, becoming the first woman to hold the position.

During the ratification of Omnibus Law on Job Creation, Puan forcefully turned off the microphone of Benny Kabur Harman, a legislator from the Demokrat party, when Harman is speaking. Puan claimed that it is her authority to do so, and she is told to do so by Azis Syamsuddin. Puan claimed that Syamsuddin has deemed Harman has spoken too much and told her to turn Harman's mic off. Puan stated that she didn't intentionally turn the mic off, but she turned it off because she wanted the proceeding to continue to proceed in order. Later, Partai Demokrat walked out from the ratification.

In 2021, during the confirmation hearing of General Andika Perkasa, Puan ignored the call of interruption by other lawmakers, closing down the meeting without acknowledging the call for interruption. Puan also rejected another interruption by Partai Keadilan Sejahtera during the ratification of Law on State Capital, claiming that as the majority of the party already agreed to pass the bill, the party that disagreed with the bill should only be heard after the ratification of the bill.

In 2022, Puan expressed her annoyance when she was not welcomed properly by a provincial governor when she made an official visit to that province, without disclosing the name of the province. She claimed that the governor of that province is disrespecting her even though she is the 23rd Speaker of the Indonesian People's Representative Council, and the governor of that province doesn't feel proud to be visited by her. It is speculated that Puan is talking about Ganjar Pranowo, as Ganjar is not welcoming Puan during her visit to Central Java.

2024 presidential election speculation 
Ahead of 2024 Indonesian general election, Puan has been the subject of speculations whether she will run for the office of presidency. Her party, the Indonesian Democratic Party of Struggle, is the only party able to field a candidate without any coalition with another party for the 2024 elections as the party meets a presidential nomination requirement of having more than 20% of the seats in the legislature. 

Her presidential candidacy is complicated by her poor results in opinion surveys that showed she is not the most popular choice within the party. Polls in the first half of 2022 showed he can only obtain single-digit numbers. During her April 2022 official visit to inaugurate a clean water facility in Central Java province, she criticized Ganjar Pranowo, the governor of Central Java, who is also speculated to join the Indonesian presidential election in 2024. Pranowo, also from PDI-P, always polls higher than Puan. During the event, a participant who called Puan as "presidential candidate" was given a thousand US dollars (IDR 20 million).

Personal life
Puan is married to businessman Hapsoro 'Happy' Sukmonohadi and they have two children. Puan and Happy held their wedding one month before the start of the reform era that was ushered in by the resignation of Suharto in May 1998. At that time, Puan’s mother Megawati was the country’s leading opposition figure in the regime of President Suharto that did not tolerate critical opposition. Puan said she had difficulty finding a venue for the wedding because many building managers canceled her booking. The wedding was eventually held at Megawati’s house in Kebagusan in South Jakarta. Puan said no state officials were present. Her husband runs an oil-related distribution business, of which Puan was part of before she entered politics.

See also
Women in Indonesia

References

1973 births
Living people
Government ministers of Indonesia
Indonesian Democratic Party of Struggle politicians
Members of the People's Representative Council, 2009
Members of the People's Representative Council, 2014
Members of the People's Representative Council, 2019
Javanese people
People from Jakarta
University of Indonesia alumni
Women government ministers of Indonesia
Working Cabinet (Joko Widodo)
Women members of the People's Representative Council
Children of national leaders
Speakers of the People's Representative Council
Women legislative speakers